omega-Atracotoxin (ω-atracotoxin) is an insect-specific neurotoxin produced by the Blue Mountains funnel-web spider. Its phylogenetic specificity derives from its ability to antagonise insect, but not vertebrate, voltage-gated calcium channels. Two spatially proximal amino acid residues, Asn(27) and Arg(35), form a contiguous molecular surface that is essential for toxin activity. It has been proposed that this surface of the beta-hairpin is a key site for interaction of the toxin with insect calcium channels.

See also
 Atracotoxin

References

Protein toxins
Neurotoxins
Ion channel toxins